The Health Threat Unit of the Directorate-General for Health and Consumer Protection (European Commission), is responsible for terrorism surveillance and early warning of biological, chemical, and radiological threats within the European Union. The Health Threat Unit runs the Rapid Alert System, which conducts surveillance on communicable diseases and diseases caused by acts of bioterrorism. The surveillance data are coordinated and evaluated by the Health Emergency Operations Facility. Health threat information and warnings are sent to the member states by the Communication and Crisis Center (BICHAT) and the Security Office in Brussels, Belgium.

Criteria for notification
The BICHAT sends a warning to the EU member states, within one hour of receiving a warning, when there is:
 Suspicion of danger
 Internationally relevant events; need for a complex response
 Need for coordination (investigative and control actions)
 Suspicion of deliberate action of a terrorist organization
 Risk of trans-frontier spread of the agent/event
 Need for assistance from other countries

Other responsibilities
Besides bioterrorism, the Health Threat Unit also has responsibility for other reportable diseases:
 Diseases preventable by vaccination
 Sexually transmitted diseases
 Viral hepatitis
 Food- and water-borne diseases and diseases of environmental origin
 Air-borne diseases
 Zoonotic diseases
 Diseases transmitted by non-conventional agents
 Serious imported diseases
 Special Health Issues (nosocomial infections; antimicrobial resistance)

Working groups
Within the Health Threat Unit, there are seven working groups responsible for various aspects of bio-defense:
 Preparedness and response planning
 Chemical threats
 Prudent use of antimicrobial agents in human medicine
 Incident investigation and sampling
 Medicinal products
 Co-operation between laboratories
 Risk communication

See also
 Global Health Security Initiative (GHSI)
 Council of Europe Convention on the Prevention of Terrorism
 European BioSafety Association (EBSA)
 European Centre for Disease Prevention and Control (ECDC)
 European program for intervention epidemiology training (EPIET)
 Health-EU portal
 Health Emergency Preparedness and Response Authority (HERA)

Sources
 Threats to health (European Union)

External links
 Public Health EU Portal the official public health portal of the European Union

Civil Service of the European Union
European medical and health organizations
Public health organizations
Health and the European Union